The Uru is a submachine gun made by the production firm Mekanika in 1977 for the Brazilian Army and Police Forces. License for weapons in 1988, bought the branch of FAU, which modernized the Thompson submachine gun in model 2. SACO Defense of the US manufactured the Uru as the Model 683 for countries without an industrial basis but were sued for copyright violations.

The overall weapon has a cylindrical body. It made the front of the air vents for cooling trunk. A tubular casing in a shop, serving also as the front handle, trigger and pistol grip. There is also a safety/selector switch, which can be translated into two points: first - for self-shooting, second - for the automatic.

There are a few different versions of the Uru: standard models chambered in 9mm Parabellum, which include early models with fixed tubular stocks and later examples with both wire and tubular folding stocks, and a pistol-caliber carbine in .38 ACP with a wooden buttstock. Optional accessories include a conical flash hider and a special barrel featuring an integrated sound suppressor that the operator may swap to rather than the standard barrel pattern.

References

External links
 Описание пистолета-пулемёта «Уру 2» на www.fire-arms.ru
 http://www.janes.com/articles/Janes-Infantry-Weapons/Uru-9-mm-sub-machine-guns-Brazil.html
 https://web.archive.org/web/20100106232455/http://www.probertencyclopaedia.com/cgi-bin/res.pl?keyword=Uru&offset=0
 http://www.securityarms.com/20010315/galleryfiles/1900/1908.htm
 http://www.securityarms.com/20010315/galleryfiles/2800/2872.htm

9mm Parabellum submachine guns
Submachine guns of Brazil